At the 1932 Summer Olympics in Los Angeles, eleven events in gymnastics were contested. The competitions were held from Monday, August 8, 1932 to Friday, August 12, 1932.

Medal summary

Participating nations
A total of 46 gymnasts from seven nations competed at the Los Angeles Games:

Medal table

References

Sources

 

 
1932 Summer Olympics events
1932
1932 in gymnastics